Argyroploce lediana is a moth of the family Tortricidae. It was described by Carl Linnaeus in 1758. It is found in Scandinavia, northern Russia, the Baltic region, Germany, Poland, the Czech Republic, Slovakia, Austria and Romania. In the east, the range extends to Japan.

The wingspan is 12–16 mm. Adults are on wing from June to July.

The larvae feed on Ledum palustre.

References

Moths described in 1758
Taxa named by Carl Linnaeus
Tortricidae of Europe
Moths of Asia
Olethreutini